Disquiet may refer to:

 Disquiet (Strugatsky novel), a 1965 sci-fi novel by Boris and Arkady Strugatsky
 Disquiet (Leigh novel), a 2008 novel by Julia Leigh
 Disquiet (Therapy? album), a 2015 album by Irish rock band Therapy?
 Disquiet, a webzine about ambient electronic music edited by Marc Weidenbaum